Hadeland is a daily, regional newspaper published in Grua, Norway since 1918. With a circulation of 7,481, it covers the region of Hadeland, including the municipalities of Gran, Lunner and Jevnaker. The newspaper is owned by A-Pressen.

References

External links
Official site

Amedia
Daily newspapers published in Norway
Mass media in Oppland
Norwegian-language newspapers
Publications established in 1918